Wilfred Banks Duncan Brown, Baron Brown PC MBE (29 November 1908 – 7 March 1985), was the chairman and the managing director of Glacier Metal Company (1939–1965), author of several books and articles on management and labour issues, university administrator, and United Kingdom's Minister of State at the Board of Trade (1965–1970).

Brown is perhaps best known for his collaboration with the organizational theorist Elliott Jaques on the Glacier Project, which Peter Drucker called "the most extensive study of actual worker behavior in large-scale industry". Sponsored by Glacier Metal Company and its Works Council during Brown's leadership, the project ran from 1948 to 1965, resulting in the development or discovery of felt-fair pay, stratified systems theory, timespan of discretion, levels of work, product pricing analysis and career progression trajectories. These ideas were described in the various books and articles written by Brown and Jaques. (See Bibliography.) Brown later attempted to use these processes in governmental affairs as a member of the House of Lords.

An advocate of practical learning for managers, Brown created the Glacier Institute of Management. He served as the first Chairman of Acton Technical College's Governing Body, Chairman of Brunel University from 1949 to 1965, and Pro-Chancellor of Brunel from 1965 to 1980. Although he never attended university, Brown received honorary degrees from Brunel University (DTech, 1966), Southern Illinois University (Doctor of Laws, 1967) and Cranfield University (DSc, 1972).

He was appointed a Member of the Order of the British Empire (MBE) in the 1943 Birthday Honours and made a life peer as Baron Brown, of Machrihanish, in the County of Argyll, on 22 December 1964.

Bibliography (selected) 
 Bate, John; Hollingan, Philip Terence; and Brown, Wilfred Banks Duncan. (1944) "Patent: CA 422903: Metal bonding method / Methode a lier des metaux". Canadian Intellectual Property Office. http://patents.ic.gc.ca/cipo/cpd/en/patent/422903/summary.html. Accessed 2008-06-01.
 Brown, Wilfred. (1945) "Incentives Within the Factory". Occupational Psychology. 19(2):82–92.
 Brown, Wilfred; and Raphael, Winifred. (1948) Managers, Men and Morale. London: Macdonald and Evans.
 Brown, Wilfred. (1956) "Can There Be Industrial Democracy?" . Fabian Journal. 18(March):14–22.
 Brown, Wilfred. (1960) Exploration In Management. London: Heinemann Educational Books.
 Brown, Wilfred. (1962) Piecework Abandoned – The Effect of Wage Incentive Systems on Managerial Authority. London: Heinemann Educational Books.
 Brown, Wilfred. (1962) “What Is Work?” Harvard Business Review. 40(5):121–129.
 Brown, Wilfred. (1963) “A Critique of Some Current Ideas About Organization”. California  Management Review. 6(1):3–12.
 Brown, Wilfred. (1964) “Judging the Performance of Subordinates.” Management International. 4(2):3–13.
 Jaques, Elliott and Brown, Wilfred. (1964) Product Analysis Pricing, a method for setting policies for the delegation of pricing decisions and the control of expense and profitability.  Carbondale, IL: Southern Illinois University Press.
 Brown, Wilfred; and Jaques, Elliott. (1965) Glacier Project Papers. London: Heinemann.
 Brown, Wilfred. (1971) Organization. London: Heinemann Educational Books.
 Brown, Wilfred.  (1973)  The Earnings Conflict – proposals for tackling the emerging crisis of industrial relations, unemployment, and wage inflation. New York: John Wiley & Sons.
 Brown, Lord Wilfred. (1975) Participation. Bradford, UK: MCB Books.
 Brown, Wilfred; and Hirsch-Weber, Wolfgang. (1983) Bismarck to Bullock: Conversations about institutions in politics and industry in Britain and Germany. London: Anglo-German Foundation for the Study of Industrial Society.

References 

 Brunel University. "". Retrieved 2008-6-1.
 Churchill Archives Centre. "The Papers of Lord Brown". Cambridge, UK: ArchiveSearch. Accessed 28 September 2021.
 Craddock, Kenneth. Requisite Organization Annotated Bibliography on Elliott Jaques, Wilfred Brown, and Requisite Leadership (covering 1942 to 2007).  Fourth Edition, March 2007. Toronto: Global Organization Design Society.
 Craddock, Kenneth C. (2007) "Requisite Organization: Theory and Validation". In Organization Design, Levels of Work and Human Capability: Executive Guide.  Shepard, Ken; Gray, Jerry L.; and Hunt, James G. (Jerry). Ontario, CA: Global Organization Design Society.
 Drucker, Peter. (1993 [1973]) Management: Tasks, Responsibilities, Practices. New York: HarperBusiness. Pp. 234.
 Jaques, Elliott. (1998) “On Leaving the Tavistock Institute”. Human Relations. 51(3): 251–258. Version available online at http://www.continents.com/Art44.htm. Accessed 2008-05-29.
 Mant, Alistair. (2005). "Reflections on the History of RO development". Presentation at the Global Organization Design Conference-2005, Toronto, 2005 August 8–11. Video in six parts. Accessed 2008-05-28.
 Mant, Alistair. (2007) "Wilfred Brown and Elliott Jaques: An Appreciation of a Remarkable Partnership”. In Organization Design, Levels of Work and Human Capability: Executive Guide.  Shepard, Ken; Gray, Jerry L.; and Hunt, James G. (Jerry). Ontario, CA: Global Organization Design Society.

External links 
 The Global Organization Design Society has digitised several of Wilfred Brown's books, available on the GO Society digital books page.
 The Papers of Lord Brown
 Photo of Wilfred Brown Building, Brunel University
 Discussion of Wilfred Brown's legacy and further reading
Entire episode about Wilfred Brown and Glacier Metal Company. Via Internet Archive Wayback Machine. Accessed 2008-06-16.

1908 births
1985 deaths
Life peers
Members of the Order of the British Empire
People educated at Rossall School
Scottish business theorists
20th-century British  economists
Common Wealth Party politicians
Members of the Privy Council of the United Kingdom
Ministers in the Wilson governments, 1964–1970
Life peers created by Elizabeth II
Common Wealth Party